Nichole Lambert (born 8 September 1948) is a French illustrator and author.  She is known for the comic strip Les Triples running since 1983 in Madame Figaro.

References

External links

1948 births
Living people
French writers
French illustrators